Ricardo Fernandes may refer to:

Ricardo Fernandes (badminton) (born 1972), Portuguese badminton player
Ricardo Fernandes (footballer, born January 1978), Portuguese football defender
Ricardo Fernandes (footballer, born April 1978), Portuguese football midfielder
Ricardo Fernandes (footballer, born 1991), Portuguese football midfielder
Ricardo Fernandes (footballer, born 1994), Portuguese football goalkeeper
Ricardo Fernandes (futsal player) (born 1986), Portuguese futsal player
Ricardo Alves Fernandes (born 1982), Brazilian football defender
Ricardo Jorge Fernandes da Silva (born 1977), Portuguese football forward